Novak Djokovic defeated Stefanos Tsitsipas in the final, 6–3, 6–4 to win the singles tennis title at the 2022 Astana Open. It was his 90th ATP Tour-level singles title.

Kwon Soon-woo was the reigning champion, but chose to compete in Tokyo instead.

Seeds

Draw

Finals

Top half

Bottom half

Qualifying

Seeds

Qualifiers

Lucky losers

Qualifying draw

First qualifier

Second qualifier

Third qualifier

Fourth qualifier

References

External links
Main draw
Qualifying draw

Astana Open - Singles